The 1983 Louisiana Tech Bulldogs football team was an American football team that represented Louisiana Tech University as a member of the Southland Conference during the 1983 NCAA Division I-AA football season. In their first year under head coach A. L. Williams, the team compiled a 4–7 record. Williams was hired as head coach in December 1982 following the resignation of Billy Brewer who left to become head coach at Ole Miss.

Schedule

References

Louisiana Tech
Louisiana Tech Bulldogs football seasons
Louisiana Tech Bulldogs football